Koninklijke Voetbalclub Kortrijk (often simply called KV Kortrijk or KVK) is a Belgian professional football club based in Kortrijk, West Flanders. They play in the Belgian First Division, and they achieved their best ranking ever during the 2009–10 season, finishing fourth after the play-offs. KV Kortrijk was founded in 1971, though their roots can be traced to 1901. They are registered to the Royal Belgian Football Association with matricule number 19. The club colours are red and white. They play their home matches at the Guldensporenstadion, named after the Battle of the Golden Spurs which took place in Kortrijk in 1302.

KV Kortrijk first entered the first division in the early 20th century, between 1906–07 and 1910–11. They eventually had to wait 65 years to return at the highest level, when they spent 15 seasons at the top flight, interrupted by a season in the second division (between 1976–77 and 1978–79 and between 1980–81 and 1991–92). KV Kortrijk also played the 1998–99 season in the first division before they returned to the Belgian Pro League in the 2008–09 season.

History
In 1901 SC Courtraisien was founded. The club merged with FC Courtraisien in 1918. They received in 1951 the name Koninklijke Kortrijk Sport. They had the matricule n°19 like the oldest club SC Courtraisien. Stade Kortrijk was founded in 1923 with matricule n°161. Because Stade Kortrijk and Koninklijke Kortrijk Sport didn't play well anymore, they merged in 1971. They could play with matricule n°19 and the new name was KV Kortrijk.

Due to bankruptcy, KV Kortrijk had to relegate in 2001 to the third division. From 2004 to 2008 KV Kortrijk played in the second division, however, in the 2007–08 season they managed to get promoted to the first division.

KV Kortrijk was bought for €5 million by Malaysian businessman Vincent Tan on 12 May 2015.

Honours
Belgian Cup:
Runners-up (1): 2011–12
Belgian Second Division:
Winners (2): 1905–06, 2007–08
Runners-up (2): 1979–80, 1997–98
Belgian Second Division Final Round:
Winners (3): 1976, 1980, 1998

Colours and badge
KV Kortrijk's colours are generally red and white. The home kit is usually all red with white trim and red shorts. The away kit is similar, except in blue. The club's logo is a white shield, split into thirds by a red upside-down, V-like shape, and the letters "KVK" are split into each third, in a red font. On top of the shield is a crown.

Stadium
KV Kortrijk plays their home matches at the Guldensporen Stadion. It is located in Kortrijk, Belgium, and the current capacity of the ground is 9,399. In the summer of 2008, the ground's capacity was increased from 6,896 to 9,399, after Kortrijk's elevation into the Belgian First Division. Guldensporenstadion literally means "Stadium of the Golden Spurs". The stadium is named after this in reference to the Battle of the Golden Spurs which, in 1302, was fought in Kortrijk. The stadium has a traditional local stadium look about it and is single-tiered all around the ground.

Current squad
''

Out on loan

Club staff

Managers

 André Van Maldeghem & Luc Maddens (1971–73)
 André Van Maldeghem & Walter Maes (1973–75)
 Georges Heylens (1975–77)
 Marijan Brnčić (1978–79)
 Raymond Mertens (1979)
 Henk Houwaart (1979–83)
 Wim Reijers (1983–84)
 André Van Maldeghem (1984–85)
 Dimitri Davidović (1985–86)
 Aad Koudijzer (1986)
 Han Grijzenhout (1986–87)
 Eddy Kinsabil (1987–88)
 Georges Leekens (1988–89)
 Henk Houwaart (1989–90)
 René Desayere (1990–91)
 Boudewijn Braem (1991–92)
 Johan Boskamp (1992 – January 1993)
 James Storme (1993–94)
 Patrick Van Geem (1994–95)
 Regi Van Acker (1995–98)
 Michel De Wolf (1998–99)
 Luc Vanderschommen (1999 – September 1999)
 Eddy Kinsabil (2000)
 Gerrit Laverge (2000–01)
 Boudewijn Braem (2001–02)
 Francky Dekenne (2002–03)
 Boudewijn Braem (2003 – February 2003)
 Angelo Nijskens (2003 – January 2004)
 Manu Ferrera (July 1, 2003–04)
 Rudi Verkempinck (September 2004–05)
 Manu Ferrera (2005 – January 29, 2006)
 Hein Vanhaezebrouck (July 1, 2006 – June 30, 2009)
 Georges Leekens (July 1, 2009 – May 11, 2010)
 Hein Vanhaezebrouck (June 6, 2010 – June 30, 2014)
 Yves Vanderhaeghe (2014–15)
 Johan Walem (2015–2016)
 Karim Belhocine (2016)
 Patrick De Wilde (2016)
 Karim Belhocine (2016)
 Bart Van Lancker (2016–2017)
 Karim Belhocine (2017)
 Yannis Anastasiou (2017)
 Glen De Boeck (2017–2018)
 Yves Vanderhaeghe (2018–2021)
 Luka Elsner (2021)
 Karim Belhocine (2021–present)

References

External links

Official Website
Kortrijk at UEFA.com

 
Association football clubs established in 1901
K.V. Kortrijk
Football clubs in Belgium
1901 establishments in Belgium
Organisations based in Belgium with royal patronage
Belgian Pro League clubs